The 2017 Vuelta a España began on 19 August, with Stage 21 scheduled for 10 September. The 2017 edition of the cycle race began with the only team time trial stage of the race.

Classification standings

Stage 1 
19 August 2017 — Nîmes, team time trial (TTT)

Stage 2 
20 August 2017 — Nîmes – Gruissan,

Stage 3 
21 August 2017 — Prades Conflent Canigó – Andorra,

Stage 4 
22 August 2017 — Escaldes-Engordany – Tarragona,

Stage 5 
23 August 2017 — Benicàssim – Alcossebre,

Stage 6 
24 August 2017 — Villarreal – Sagunto,

Stage 7 
25 August 2017 — Llíria – Cuenca,

Stage 8 
26 August 2017 — Hellín – Xorret de Catí,

Stage 9 
27 August 2017 — Orihuela –  Cumbre del Sol, El Poble Nou de Benitatxell,

Rest day 
28 August 2017 — Province of Alicante

Stage 10 
29 August 2017 — Caravaca de la Cruz – ElPozo Alimentación, Alhama de Murcia,

Stage 11
30 August 2017 — Lorca – Calar Alto,

Notes

References 

2017 Vuelta a España
Vuelta a España stages